Baraguey d'Hilliers may refer to:

People with the surname
 Count Baraguey d'Hilliers, a title held by Achille and Louis:
 Achille Baraguey d'Hilliers (1795–1878), politician, Marshal of France, and son of Louis Baraguey d'Hilliers
 Louis Baraguey d'Hilliers (1764–1813), French general during the Napoleonic Wars and father of Achille Baraguey d'Hilliers

Other uses
 Hougoumont (ship), a tall ship renamed Baraguey d'Hilliers during her service in the Crimean War

See also

 Hillyer (disambiguation)
 Hillier (disambiguation)